Gu Chaohao (May 15, 1926 – June 24, 2012) was a Chinese mathematician. He graduated from National Chekiang University (Zhejiang University) in 1948, and received a doctorate in physics and mathematical science from Moscow University in 1959. He was primarily engaged in research on partial differential equations, differential geometry, solitons, and mathematical physics. He served as vice president of Fudan University and from 1988 to 1993 as president of the University of Science and Technology of China. In 1980, he was elected an academician of the Chinese Academy of Sciences. He received the Highest Science and Technology Award in 2009.

Works
 Gu Chaohao, Hu H, Zhou Xixiang:Darboux Transformations in Integrable Systems 2005 Springer, 
 Gu Chaohao Ed:Soliton Theory and Its Applications, Springer 
 Differential Geometry and Differential Equations:Proceedings of a Symposium, Shanghai, 1985, Editors: M. Berger, Gu Chaohao, R.L. Bryant, Springer 
 Gu Chaohao, Li Ta-Tsien, Hu Hesheng:Differential Geometry and Related Topics, World Scientific Pub Co, Singapore  
 Gu Chaohao, Li Yishen Ed, Nonlinear Physics: Proceedings of the International Conference, Shanghai, Peoples Rep of China, April 24–30, 1989 Springer,

References 

1926 births
2012 deaths
Educators from Wenzhou
Academic staff of Fudan University
Mathematicians from Zhejiang
Members of the Chinese Academy of Sciences
Moscow State University alumni
Presidents of the University of Science and Technology of China
Scientists from Wenzhou
Academic staff of the University of Science and Technology of China
Writers from Wenzhou
Zhejiang University alumni